Josef Straka (14 July 1904 – 29 June 1976) was a Czechoslovak rower who won one silver and three bronze medals at the European championships of 1925–1932. He competed at the 1928 and 1936 Olympics in the single and double sculls, respectively, but failed to reach the finals. His son was also named Josef Straka and was also an Olympic rower.

References

1904 births
1976 deaths
Olympic rowers of Czechoslovakia
Rowers at the 1928 Summer Olympics
Rowers at the 1936 Summer Olympics
Czechoslovak male rowers
People from Mělník
European Rowing Championships medalists
Sportspeople from the Central Bohemian Region